Maria Elisabeth of Austria (German: Maria Elisabeth Josefa Johanna Antonia; 13 August 1743 – 22 September 1808) was an archduchess of Austria and princess of Tuscany, Bohemia, and Hungary as the daughter of Empress Maria Theresa and Emperor Francis Stephen. She was an abbess of the Convent for Noble Ladies in Innsbruck  in Innsbruck from 1780 until 1806.

Early life

Born on 13 August 1743, Maria Elisabeth Josefa Johanna Antonia was the sixth (fourth living) of the sixteen children of Maria Theresa, absolute ruler of the Habsburg monacrhy and Francis I Stephen, Holy Roman Emperor. She was given the customary education of an archduchess with a focus on religion, foreign languages, and etiquette, designed  to make her a good consort. She was known as Elisabeth or Liesl in her family.
As an infant, Elisabeth was small, frail, and sickly, worrying her family. Probably as a result of some gastrointestinal disease, she often failed to retain food and developed slowly. Eventually, Elisabeth strengthened and grew into a lively child, who liked games and jokes, and teased her many siblings often. She was also very vain as a result of being considered the most beautiful among the archduchesses from an early age.
In adolescence, Elisabeth was described as unstable and eccentric, without any particular interests. She was fun-loving and neglected her studies. She earned her mother's censure by liking gossip and mocking everyone, offending her siblings and attendants with ironic comments. Her staff changed often, as few could stand her. Elisabeth was a difficult child to raise, and five ayas were appointed in turn to educate her; even her confessor needed to be changed once. Her mother considered her childish and immature, calling her eine Kokette der Schönheit ('a pretty coquette'), observing: 'It mattered not if the look of admiration came from a prince or a Swiss guard, Elisabeth was satisfied.'

She was active in court life: at the wedding of her brother Joseph in 1765, she played the part of Apollo in the operetta Il Parnaso confuso by Christoph Willibald Gluck.

Marriage negotiations
Elisabeth was considered a valuable asset in dynastic marriage negotiations due to her beauty. She was a subject of marriage speculations at an early age, but many proposals were denied because of the Viennese court's high expectations for the status of her groom.When Charles III of Spain was widowed in 1761, there were negotiations between Spain and Austria about a marriage between him and Elisabeth, but these ultimately failed. A marriage with King Stanisław II August of Poland was suggested after his succession in 1764, but both Catherine the Great of Russia and Maria Theresa disapproved for political reasons. The empress of Russia was wary of the Habsburg monarchy becoming stronger in Central and Eastern Europe, and Elisabeth's mother considered King Stanisław untrustworthy and of lowly origins. Next, her cousin, Prince Benedetto, Duke of Chablais was proposed. Elisabeth declared herself very willing, but her brother Joseph did not find the match politically advantageous enough. In 1767, Elisabeth was already twenty-four, considered late to be unmarried for a princess in the 18th century.

In 1768, simultaneously with the discussions of a marriage between her younger sister Archduchess Maria Antonia and Dauphin Louis Auguste (the future Louis XVI), a suggestion was made to engage Elisabeth to the widowed Louis XV of France, the dauphin's grandfather. A marriage contract was prepared and the negotiations were almost completed. However, before they could be finalised, Elisabeth fell ill with smallpox. Although she made a full recovery, it was reported that the illness had terribly scarred her face and destroyed her beauty, thus disrupting all plans of marriage. Additionally, the Choiseul party at the French royal court opposed the idea of King Louis XV remarrying.

Abbess in Innsbruck
Elisabeth was appointed canoness of the Convent for Noble Ladies in Innsbruck by her mother, which had been established by her mother in 1765 to pray for the soul of her late husband, Francis Stephen. Like her unmarried sister Maria Anna, she did not live in the convent but continued to spend her time with the imperial court in Vienna.

After the death of her mother Maria Theresa in 1780, Elisabeth and her sisters Maria Anna and Maria Christina were asked by their brother Joseph II to leave court because he shunned the presence of women there, and wanted to put an end to what he referred to as his sisters Weiberwirtschaft or 'women’s republic'. In May 1781, Elisabeth went to Innsbruck, where she would reside in the Imperial Castle as abbess for fifteen years, until January 1806. She did not live a monastic life: the convent afforded its members high rank, a personal allowance, a suite of rooms, and the freedom to participate in public life and high society. Elisabeth entertained much in her apartments, receiving guests and arranging family receptions. During this time, she was described as  obese, and was referred to as the 'Kropferte Liesl'

because of her smallpox scars. She became known and feared for her sharp wit; her friends described her as popular with a fiery personality. Sir John Swinburne described her sharp wit and humorous self-irony upon his visit.

Her younger brother Leopold, who succeeded Joseph as emperor in 1790 involved her more in state affairs, giving her representational tasks. In 1790, she ceremoniously opened the Landtag (State Diet) of Tyrol in his place, and often acted as his representative at ceremonial occasions. She received many important guests and entertained artists such as Johann Wolfgang von Goethe. She was allowed to travel again and visited the Puster Valley several times with her chamberlain, Count Spaur, and spent the winter of 1800-1801 in Bruneck.

Flight to Linz and death
In January 1806, Elisabeth fled from Innsbruck to Vienna and then to Linz when Tyrol was taken over by Napoleon Bonaparte’s ally, the Kingdom of Bavaria. She spent her last years there, dying on 22 September 1808 at the age of sixty-five. She was buried in the Old Cathedral.

Ancestry

References

 

1743 births
1808 deaths
Austrian princesses
18th-century Austrian people
19th-century Austrian people
18th-century Austrian women
19th-century Austrian women
Burials at the Imperial Crypt
House of Habsburg
Daughters of emperors
Children of Maria Theresa
Daughters of kings